Heswall railway station was on the Birkenhead Railway route between  and . It served the town of Heswall between 1886 and 1956.

History
This station opened on 19 April 1886, on the Birkenhead Railway's branch line from Hooton to West Kirby. This line passed through the western side of Heswall, alongside the River Dee. The station closed to passengers on 17 September 1956 and closed completely in 1962.

Present day
While being on the line currently occupied by the Wirral Way any walker following the former track bed will not pass close to the station's site; the original station house was sold into private ownership and then subsequently sold on for development (during the early 1970s). The site was razed and built over in the 1960s and all walkers, cyclists, etc. must take a detour to regain the track bed.

It is approximately 2.4 km south west of the station in current operation on the Bidston to Wrexham line.

References

Further reading

External links

Heswall Station on navigable 1952 O.S. map

Disused railway stations in the Metropolitan Borough of Wirral
Former Birkenhead Railway stations
Railway stations in Great Britain opened in 1886
Railway stations in Great Britain closed in 1956